Boca de Parita is a town in the Herrera Province of Panama.

Sources 
World Gazeteer: Panama – World-Gazetteer.com

Populated places in Herrera Province